Salvia columbariae is an annual plant that is commonly called chia, chia sage, golden chia, or desert chia, because its seeds are used in the same way as those of Salvia hispanica (chia).  It grows in California, Nevada, Utah, Arizona, New Mexico, Sonora, and Baja California, and was an important food for Native Americans.  Some native names include pashiiy from Tongva and it'epeš from Ventureño.

Description

Its stem hairs are generally short and sparse in distribution. The leaves are pinnately dissected and the lobes are irregularly rounded. The inflorescence is more or less scapose, meaning it has a long peduncle that comes from the ground level that has bracts. The bracts are round and awn-tipped. There are usually 1–2 cluster of flowers within the inflorescence. The lower lip is about twice the size of the upper lip. The flower color can be pale blue to blue and purple tipped. The stamens of the plant are slightly exserted.

Varieties
Salvia columbariae var. columbariae Benth. – California sage, chia
Salvia columbariae var. ziegleri Munz – Ziegler's sage

Habitat
Salvia columbariae can be found in dry undisturbed sites, chaparral, and coastal sage scrub. In cultivation, it prefers good drainage, sun, and dry weather.

Uses

Medicinal uses
The Cahuilla used the columbariae Benth. variety as a disinfectant by grinding the seeds to mush and applying it to infections as a poultice. The Cahuilla, Ohlone, Kawaiisu, and Mahuna used the gelatinous seeds to cleanse out foreign matter in the eyes. The seeds were placed in the eyes for infections and inflammation, and during sleep, they were tucked underneath the eyelids to remove sand particles. The Ohlone also used it to reduce fevers by consuming the seeds, and the Diegueno chewed the seeds on journeys by foot to give strength.

Food
The Cahuilla, Kawaiisu, Mohave, Tohono O'odham, Chumash and Akimel O'odham grind the seeds and mixed it into water to make a thick beverage. The Cahuillas removed the alkali salts in the water, improving the flavor. They also dry the seeds to make cakes or mush. The Ohlones, Mohave, and Pomo make pinole. The Diegueno added the seeds to wheat to improve flavor. The Mahuna, Paiute, and Akimel O'odham make it into a gelatinous material, then cook it into porridge. The Luiseno, Tubatulabal, and Yavapai used it extensively as a food source.

Building material
The Mahuna made it into a fiber and covered their dwellings.

References

External links
 
 
 
 

columbariae
Flora of Northwestern Mexico
Flora of Arizona
Flora of Baja California
Flora of California
Flora of New Mexico
Flora of Nevada
Flora of Utah
Flora of Sonora
North American desert flora
Flora of the California desert regions
Flora of the Sierra Nevada (United States)
Natural history of the California chaparral and woodlands
Edible nuts and seeds
Crops originating from Pre-Columbian North America
Plants used in Native American cuisine
Plants used in traditional Native American medicine
Pre-Columbian Native American cuisine
Post-Columbian Native American cuisine
Pre-Columbian California cuisine
Pre-Columbian Southwest cuisine
Annual plants
Garden plants of North America
Drought-tolerant plants